Jannick "Janik" Top is a French bass player and composer, born in Marseille. Top plays the electric bass and the cello.

In the 1970s, he was a lead member of the influential zeuhl band Magma, along with Christian Vander and Didier Lockwood. From 1977 to 1980, he played in the popular electronic project Space.

Since then, he has worked with many other musicians, including session work for Michel Berger, France Gall, Richard Cocciante, Bonnie Tyler, Eurythmics, Ray Charles, Céline Dion as well as live playing and musical direction for shows, including Johnny Hallyday and Starmania. In association with Serge Perathoner, keyboardist, he has also done a variety of film and advertisement music.

See also
 Magma
 Mëkanïk Dëstruktïẁ Kömmandöh (1973)

External links
 Official site

References

Living people
French bass guitarists
Musicians from Marseille
Magma (band) members
Progressive rock bass guitarists
1947 births